The surname Patrick has several origins. In some cases it is an Anglicised form of the Gaelic Mac Phádraig, derived from world elements meaning "son of Patrick". This Gaelic surname is derived from the Latin Patricius, which is in turn derived from word elements meaning "member of the patrician class". In other cases, the surname Patrick is a shortened form of the surnames Mulpatrick and Fitzpatrick. The surname Patrick appears in Ireland due to Scottish emigration. People with the surname Patrick include:

Aaron Patrick (born 1996), American football player
Alan Patrick (footballer) (born 1991), Brazilian footballer
Alf Patrick (1921–2021), English footballer
Alice Patrick (born 1948), American muralist
Allen Patrick (born 1984), American football running back
Allen Russell Patrick (1910–1995), Canadian politician
Andrew G. Patrick (1907–1955), American architect
Arthur Patrick (1934–2013), Australian theologian and historian
Ben Patrick (born 1984), American football tight end
Bill Patrick (footballer) (1932–2003), Scottish footballer
Bill Patrick (sports anchor) (born 1955), American sportscaster
Bob Patrick (1917–1999), American baseball outfielder
Brenda Jean Patrick (born 1955), American educational consultant
Bronswell Patrick (born 1970), American baseball relief pitcher
Butch Patrick (born 1953), American actor
Cedeno Patrick (born 1983), American football player
Chris Patrick (born 1984), American football offensive tackle
Claude Patrick (born 1980), Canadian mixed martial arts fighter
Colin Patrick (1893–1942), British politician
Craig Patrick (born 1946), American hockey player, coach and general manager
Dan Patrick (sportscaster) (born 1956), American sportscaster
Dan Patrick (Texas politician) (born 1950), American politician
Danica Patrick (born 1982), American auto racing driver
Danny Patrick (born 1972), British film director and screenwriter
Darrin Patrick, American author and pastor
David M. Patrick (born 1947), English organist
David Patrick (writer) (1849–1914), Scottish writer and editor
David Patrick (athlete) (born 1960), American hurdler
Dennis Patrick (1918–2002), American character actor
Dennis R. Patrick (born 1951), American Chairman of the Federal Communications Commission
Deval Patrick (born 1956), American politician
Diane Patrick (born 1951), American First Lady of Massachusetts
Diane Porter Patrick (born 1946), American politician
Dorothy Patrick (1921–1987), American film actress
Edwin D. Patrick (1894–1945), American general
Emily Patrick (born 1959), English painter
Eric Patrick, American filmmaker
Frank Patrick (running back) (1915–1992), American football player
Frank Patrick (quarterback) (born 1947), American football player
Frank Patrick (ice hockey) (1885–1960), Canadian ice hockey player
Fred Patrick (1965–1989), Dutch-Surinamese footballer
Gail Patrick (1911–1980), American film actress
Glenn Patrick (born 1950), American ice hockey player
Hugh Talbot Patrick (1860–1939), American neurologist
James MacIntosh Patrick (1907–1998), Scottish painter
James Patrick (British Army officer), British military officer
James Patrick (Canadian football) (born 1982), Canadian football cornerback
James Patrick (ice hockey) (born 1963), Canadian ice hockey defenceman
Jerome Patrick (1883–1923), American film actor
Jody Patrick (born 1978), Canadian badminton player
John Patrick (dramatist) (1905–1995), American playwright and screenwriter
John Patrick (rugby union) (1898–1959), American rugby union player
John R. Patrick (born 1945), American businessperson
Johnny Patrick (born 1988), American football player
Jordan Patrick (born 1992), English footballer
Julian Patrick (1927–2009), American opera singer
Kae T. Patrick (born 1934), American politician
Kathy Patrick, American author and hairdresser
Katie Patrick (born 1980), Australian environmentalist
Kenneth R. Patrick (1915-2002) Royal Canadian Air Force Officer, Founder of Canadian Aviation Electronics (CAE Inc.)
Larne Patrick (born 1988), English rugby league footballer
Lawrence Patrick (1920–2006), American auto safety researcher
Lee Patrick (actress) (1901–1982), American actress
Lee Patrick (saxophonist) (born 1938), American musician
Leonard Patrick (1913–2006), American mobster
Lester Patrick (1883–1960), Canadian ice hockey player and coach
Lucas Patrick (born 1993), American football player
Luther Patrick (1894–1957), American politician
Lynn Patrick (1912–1980), Canadian ice hockey centre
Marcus Patrick (born 1974), British actor
Margaret Patrick (1913–1994), American musician known as "Ebony"
Mark Patrick, American radio personality
Marsena R. Patrick (1811–1888), American general and college president
Mason Patrick (1863–1942), American general, first Chief of the Army Air Corps
Mathew St. Patrick, American actor
Matt Patrick (footballer) (1919–2005), Scottish footballer
Matt Patrick (producer) (born 1974), American musician
Matthew Patrick (politician) (born 1952), American politician
Matthew Patrick (Internet personality) (born 1986), American Internet personality
Michelle Patrick (born 1949), American television soap opera writer
Mike Patrick, American sportscaster
Mike Patrick (American football) (1952–2008), American football punter
Muzz Patrick (1916–1998), Canadian ice hockey player
Myles Patrick (born 1954), American basketball player
Natrez Patrick (born 1997), American football player
Nicholas Patrick (born 1964), American astronaut
Nick Patrick (actor), British actor
Nigel Patrick (1913–1981), English actor and stage director
Pat Patrick (musician) (1929–1991), American jazz musician
Paul Patrick (1950–2008), English teacher and LGBT rights activist
Rhianna Patrick (born 1977), Australian radio personality
Richard Patrick (born 1968), American rock musician
Robert Patrick (born 1958), American actor
Robert Patrick (playwright) (born 1937), American playwright and writer
Ronald Patrick (born 1991), American football player
Roy Patrick (1935–1998), English footballer
Ruth Patrick (1907-2013), American botanist
Simon Patrick (1626–1707), English theologian and bishop
Stephen Patrick (born 1932), Canadian politician
Steve Patrick (born 1961), Canadian ice hockey player
Carmen Electra (born Tara Patrick in 1972), American actress
Tera Patrick (born 1976), American pornographic actress
Todd Patrick, music promoter
Trevor Patrick (born 1947), New Zealand rugby league footballer
U. E. Patrick, American auto racing team owner
Van Patrick (1916–1974), American sportscaster
Vincent Patrick, American novelist
Wayne Patrick (1946–2010), American football running back
William C. Patrick III (1926–2010), American microbiologist
William Donald Patrick, Lord Patrick (1889–1967), Scottish judge
William Patrick (Canadian politician) (1810–1883), Canadian clergyman and politician
William Patrick (author), American science editor
William Patrick (minister) (1791–1872), Scottish clergyman
William Penn Patrick (1930–1973), American businessman

Fictional 
 Miranda and Morgan Patrick, a single mother and her daughter from Andi Mack

See also

Patrick (given name)
Patrick (disambiguation)

References

English-language surnames
Surnames of Irish origin
Scottish surnames